Aporajeyo (2022) is an upcoming Indian Bengali-language film directed by Nehal Dutta. The film starts Ranjit Mallick, Sabitri Chatterjee, Laboni Sarkar. In this film Ranjit Mallick returned to big screen with playing the character of Subhankar Sanyal.

Cast 
 Ranjit Mallick
 Sabitri Chatterjee
 Laboni Sarkar
 Sumit Ganguly
 Mrinal Mukherjee

Release and reception 
The trailer of the movie released on 29 July 2022 on YouTube. The film is expected to release in 2022.

Trivia 
In the movie, Ranjit Mallick played the character of Subhankar Sanyal, an honest lawyer. Mallick played a similar rebel character — Subhankar Sanyal, an honest policeman, in 1984 Bengali film Shatru. Different scenes and dialogues of Aporajeyo connects Mallick's character in the movie Shatru.

References

External links 
 Official trailer on YouTube

2020s Bengali-language films
2022 drama films
2022 films
Indian drama films
Bengali-language Indian films
Upcoming Bengali-language films